European Korfball Championship or European Korfball A-Championship is a korfball competition for European national teams organized by the International Korfball Federation. It was played every four years from 1998 until 2014 and then moved to a tournament every two years, starting from 2016. The number of participated teams has varied between 8 and 16. The Netherlands national korfball team has won each edition.

History
From 2005 until 2013, the IKF organized the Korfball European Bowl for nations which had failed to qualify for the European Korfball Championship. In these tournaments it was possible to win places for the next European Korfball Championships and sometimes also IKF World Korfball Championships. The tournament was abolished in 2013 as the number of teams in the European Korfball Championship had risen to 16, however the IKF decided to bring this number down again to 8 by 2018 and to create a European Korfball B-Championship similar to the European Bowl but with a promotion/relegation system to be put into place between both championships. These B-Championships will first be held in 2018.

Results

Debut of teams

Medals summary

See also
International Korfball Federation
European Korfball B-Championship
Korfball European Bowl

External links
International Korfball Federation

 
Korfball competitions
Korfball in Europe
European championships